To the Teeth is singer-songwriter Ani DiFranco's 10th studio album (excluding EPs, live albums and her collaborations with Utah Phillips), released in November 1999.

To the Teeth has a more political and self-questioning edge than many of her earlier works. It is also considerably more experimental, with "Freakshow", "Swing", "Carry You Around" and "The Arrivals Gate" branching out into genres such as blues, jazz and funk. She was also supported by Prince on the track "Providence".

It opens with the title track, an indictment of America's gun culture, and a response to the Columbine High School massacre. It also contains "Soft Shoulder", about two lovers missing their opportunity, and "Hello Birmingham", a sad, angry response to both the shooting murder of abortion doctor Barnett Slepian and the bombing of a Birmingham, Alabama, abortion clinic.

To the Teeth reached No. 76 on the Billboard Music Chart Top 200, and No. 9 on their Top Internet Albums chart.

Track listing
All songs by Ani DiFranco.

 "To the Teeth" – 7:42
 "Soft Shoulder" – 6:04
 "Wish I May" – 4:53
 "Freakshow" – 5:42
 "Going Once" – 5:33
 "Hello Birmingham" – 5:23
 "Back Back Back" – 4:46
 "Swing" – 6:10
 "Carry You Around" – 3:24
 "Cloud Blood" – 4:51
 "The Arrivals Gate" – 4:35
 "Providence" – 7:18
 "I Know This Bar" – 5:31

Personnel 
 Ani DiFranco – organ, acoustic guitar, banjo, bass, piano, drums, electric guitar, triangle, vocals, steel drums, bells, megaphone, tenor guitar, baritone guitar
 Daren Hahn – drums, turntables
 Kingsway Clap and Stomp Corps – clapping
 Irvin Mayfield – trumpet
 Jason Mercer – banjo, electric bass, upright bass
 Mark Mullins – trombone
 Corey Parker – rapping
 Maceo Parker – flute, saxophone
 Prince – vocals
 Kurt Swinghammer – guitar, electric guitar
 Brian Wolf – trombone, trumpet, tuba
 Julie Wolf – organ, piano, accordion, vocals, clavinet, melodica, Fender Rhodes, Wurlitzer

Production 
Ani DiFranco – producer, mixing
 Goat Boy – engineer, photography
 Ethan Allen – assistant engineer
Greg Calbi – mastering
 Design – Cheryl Neary
  Patty Wallace – photography

Charts 
Album

References

Ani DiFranco albums
1999 albums
Righteous Babe Records albums